Albertinia is a settlement in Hessequa Municipality in the Western Cape province of South Africa.

Village 50 km west of Mossel Bay, at the foot of the Langeberg Mountains, and is fondly referred to as the home of the Aloe.

Albertinia has two Aloe factories, as Aloe Ferox, or Cape Aloe is indigenous to the area. Another indigenous plant to the Albertinia district is Thamnochortus insignis, commonly known as thatch, which is exported for commercial use.

Due to the dry climate, Albertinia demarcates the end of the Klein Karoo Wine Route, one will find various vineyards at the foot of the mountain slopes.

Albertinia also boasts a 9 Hole golf course.

It was laid out in 1900 on the farm Grootfontein and became a municipality in 1920. The name is derived from the surname of Johannes Rudolph Albertyn (1847-1920), the first Dutch Reformed minister to serve the community.

References

Populated places in the Hessequa Local Municipality
Populated places established in 1900